The South Australian Employers' Chamber of Commerce and Industry (known as Business SA since 2000) is an independent and non-profit association representing businesses and employers in South Australia. It is a member of the  Australian Chamber of Commerce and Industry. Business SA is South Australia’s largest membership-based employer organisation with over 4,000 members across 19 different industry sectors. 

The purpose of Business SA is to create a stronger South Australia by supporting the business community and helping businesses to grow by delivering the best possible environment for businesses to succeed. Business SA offers the following products and services to its members including HR and workplace relations, WHS in the workplace, training courses, business growth and succession, entrepreneur programs, international services, business advice hotline, networking and advocacy.

History
Historically, employer organisations in Australia were established to counter the union movement’s growing industrial relations influence. This became more important over time as union tactics became increasingly aggressive, making it harder for individual employers to deal with their employees in good faith.

Business SA can trace its origins back to 1839. Just three years after the Colony of South Australia was established, the Adelaide Chamber of Commerce was formed on 7 January 1839. 

This was followed by the South Australian Chamber of Manufacturers in 1869 as a lobby and support group for manufacturers, and the South Australian Employers’ Federation in 1889.

In 1972, the Adelaide Chamber of Commerce and the South Australian Chamber of Manufacturers merged to form the Chamber of Commerce and Industry SA, Inc.

In 1993, the Chamber of Commerce and Industry and the South Australian Employers’ Federation merged to form the South Australian Employers’ Chamber of Commerce and Industry Inc. 

The new entity was officially launched in 2000 with a new trading name, Business SA.

References
What is Business SA? - Business SA website, retrieved 8 April 2022
Chambers of commerce in Australia
Organisations based in South Australia
Economy of South Australia
Employers' organizations